The San Bernardino meridian, established in 1852, is one of three principal meridians in the state of California. Because of the state's shape, three meridian–baseline sets are required for surveys in all parts of the state. The San Bernardino meridian is used for Southern California, and some townships in Arizona are also referenced to it.

The initial point (datum) is at the summit of Mount San Bernardino, in the San Bernardino Mountains, in San Bernardino County, California.

The meridian runs north–south from the initial point .

See also
List of principal and guide meridians and base lines of the United States

References

External links

Surveying of the United States
Named meridians
Geography of California
Geography of San Bernardino County, California
1852 establishments in California
San Bernardino Mountains
Meridians and base lines of the United States